Douglas is a city in Coffee County, Georgia, United States. As of the 2020 census, the city had a population of 11,722. Douglas is the county seat of Coffee County and the core city of the Douglas, Georgia Micropolitan Statistical Area, which had a population of 50,731 as of the 2010 census.

History
Douglas was founded in 1855 as the seat of the newly formed Coffee County. It was named for Senator Stephen A. Douglas from Illinois, a renowned stump speaker who was the challenger to Abraham Lincoln in the presidential election of 1860.

Douglas was chartered as a town in 1895 and as a city in 1897. In 1895, the railroad came to Douglas and the community began to boom. In 1909, the Georgia and Florida Railway located its offices in Douglas.

The Eleventh District Agricultural & Mechanical School was established in Douglas in 1906. In 1927, South Georgia College was founded as Georgia's first state-supported junior college.

During the 1920s and 1930s, Douglas was one of the major tobacco markets in the state. Much of this history is depicted in the Heritage Station Museum, located in the former Georgia and Florida Railway train station on Ward Street in downtown Douglas.

Douglas has two areas listed on the National Register of Historic Places: the downtown and Gaskin Avenue historic districts. They were added to the list in 1989.

Geography
Douglas is located near the center of Coffee County at  (31.507413, −82.850799). It is  driving distance northeast of Valdosta, Georgia,  driving distance northwest of Jacksonville, Florida, and  driving distance southeast of Atlanta.

Major water bodies include Twenty Mile Creek, the Seventeen Mile River (a tributary of the Satilla River), and Hilliard's Pond, which was once the ski show park "Holiday Beach".

Climate

Demographics

2020 census

As of the 2020 United States Census, there were 11,722 people, 4,339 households, and 2,610 families residing in the city.

2000 census
As of the census of 2000, there were 10,639 people, 3,977 households, and 2,656 families residing in the city. According to the most recent ACS, the racial composition of Douglas was: 50.78% Black or African American, 42.95% White, 0.27% Native American, 1.09% Asian, 0.05% Pacific Islander, 3.80% from other races, and 1.05% from two or more races. Hispanic or Latino of any race were 6.92% of the population.

There were 3,977 households, out of which 32.5% had children under the age of 18 living with them, 41.3% were married couples living together, 21.3% had a female householder with no husband present, and 33.2% were non-families. 28.3% of all households were made up of individuals, and 12.8% had someone living alone who was 65 years of age or older. The average household size was 2.57 and the average family size was 3.14.

In the city, the population was spread out, with 27.8% under the age of 18, 11.6% from 18 to 24, 26.3% from 25 to 44, 19.8% from 45 to 64, and 14.5% who were 65 years of age or older. The median age was 33 years. For every 100 females, there were 83.9 males. For every 100 females age 18 and over, there were 77.0 males.

The median income for a household in the city was $27,946, and the median income for a family was $36,349. Males had a median income of $26,551 versus $20,145 for females. The per capita income for the city was $15,652. About 17.9% of families and 24.4% of the population were below the poverty line, including 31.2% of those under age 18 and 22.0% of those age 65 or over.

Douglas Micropolitan Statistical Area

Douglas is the principal city of the Douglas Micropolitan Statistical Area, a micropolitan area that covers Atkinson and Coffee counties and had a combined population of 50,731 at the 2010 census.

Infrastructure

Highways
 U.S. Route 221 (runs north-south)
 U.S. Route 441 (runs north-south)
 Georgia State Route 31 (runs north-south)
 Georgia State Route 32 (runs east-west)
 Georgia State Route 135 (runs north-south)
 Georgia State Route 158 (runs east-west)
 Georgia State Route 206 (runs east-west)

Airport
Douglas Municipal Airport

Utilities
 The Electric Department, locally owned and a member of the Municipal Electric Authority of Georgia, services Douglas with power.
 The Natural Gas Department, member of both Georgia & American Public Gas Association and the Municipal Gas Authority of Georgia, provides gas to the area.
 Water and sewer service is conducted by the city's Water Department.
 The Public Works Department handles yard clippings, junk items, and animal control for the city.

Economy

Major employers

 Wal-Mart
 Premium Peanut
 Premium Waters
 American Insulated Wire
 Fleetwood Mobile Homes Corporation
 PCC Airfoils
 Pilgrim's

Agriculture
Farming plays a large role in the area's economy. Major agricultural products from the town and surrounding county include peanuts, corn, tobacco, and cotton. Chicken is also a major part of the economy.

Tourism
Douglas is home to Heritage Station Museum, which displays artifacts of the city's history. The World War II Flight Training Museum (the old 63rd Army Air Forces Contract Pilot School), Broxton Rocks, and the Ashley-Slater House are also popular tourist attractions in the area. All three were recently named among "Georgia's Hidden Treasures" in a segment on WSB-TV.

Douglas has ten public parks. There are four golf courses in and around the city.

Nearby, the  General Coffee State Park draws more than 100,000 visitors a year and is the most popular tourist attraction in the area.

Healthcare
Coffee Regional Medical Center
Coffee Regional Walk-In Clinic

Media
 WOKA Dixie Country 106.7 FM
 WOKA Radio 1310 AM
 WOUG Radio Cielo 107.3 FM
 WULS Radio 103.7 FM
 WDMG Radio 97.9 FM, 860 AM
 WPNG Radio Shine 101.9 FM
 WSIZ Radio MyFM 102.3 @ 99.9 FM
 The Douglas News
 The Douglas Enterprise
 WSWG, CBS TV

Education

Coffee County School District 
The Douglas-Coffee County area is served by the Coffee County Board of Education. The Coffee County School District holds pre-school to grade twelve, and consists of eight elementary schools, a middle school, three high schools, and an alternative education center. The district has 438 full-time teachers and over 8,000 students.
Ambrose Elementary School
Broxton Mary-Hayes Elementary School
Eastside Elementary School
Indian Creek Elementary School
Nicholls Elementary School
Satilla Elementary School
West Green Elementary School
Westside Elementary School
Coffee Middle School
George Washington Carver Freshman Campus
Coffee County Career Academy
Coffee High School
Coffee Alternative Education Center

Private schools
First Academy at First Baptist Church provides preschool (1 year olds - 3 year olds), pre-kindergarten, and K-12.
Citizens Christian Academy is K-12
First United Methodist Church provides pre-kindergarten

Higher education 
South Georgia State College is a public four-year institution of the University System of Georgia.
Wiregrass Georgia Technical College

Notable people

 James Brown, singer, lived here for a short time while working at a local saw mill. He was a native of Augusta, Georgia.
 Jason Childers, Major League Baseball player for the Tampa Bay Rays, member of the South Georgia College and Kennesaw State Athletic Hall of Fame
 G. Wayne Clough, Secretary of the Smithsonian Institution and former president of Georgia Institute of Technology (1994–2008), spent his early years in Douglas.  His father served as mayor.
 Greg Holland, country singer
 Justin Lewis, co-founder and CTO of NationalField, a private, enterprise-based social network used by the 2008 and 2012 presidential campaigns of Barack Obama
 Jennifer Nettles, one-half of the country music duo Sugarland, is a native of Douglas.
 Joel Parrish, football player
 Willie Spence, singer and runner-up of Season 19 of American Idol
 Maureen Tucker, drummer and occasional singer of 1960s and 1970s rock group The Velvet Underground, lives in Douglas.
 Greg Walker, former first baseman and hitting coach for the 2005 World Champion Chicago White Sox, is a native of Douglas. He was the hitting coach for the Atlanta Braves 2012–2014.
 Tyreek Hill, American football player for the Miami Dolphins of the National Football League (NFL).
 Wyatt Miller, American football player for the Cleveland Browns of the National Football League (NFL).

See also
 Eleventh District A & M School-South Georgia College Historic District
63rd Army Air Forces Contract Pilot School

References

External links
 City of Douglas official website
 Douglas-Coffee County Chamber of Commerce
 City of Douglas at Georgia.gov 

Cities in Georgia (U.S. state)
Cities in Coffee County, Georgia
Micropolitan areas of Georgia (U.S. state)
County seats in Georgia (U.S. state)
1855 establishments in Georgia (U.S. state)